Freedom Township is an inactive township in Lafayette County, Missouri.

Freedom Township was established in 1832, and named after the universal principle of freedom.

References

Townships in Missouri
Townships in Lafayette County, Missouri